"By the Book" is a song co-written and recorded by American country music artist Michael Peterson. It was released in September 1998 as the fifth and final single from his 1997 album Michael Peterson. The song reached No. 19 on the Billboard Hot Country Singles & Tracks chart.  Peterson wrote the song with Robert Ellis Orrall.

Chart performance

References

1998 singles
1997 songs
Michael Peterson (singer) songs
Songs written by Robert Ellis Orrall
Songs written by Michael Peterson (singer)
Song recordings produced by Josh Leo
Reprise Records singles